Shimoni bat lyssavirus is a Lyssavirus which was discovered in Kenya in 2009. It bears significant similarities to the Lyssavirus Lagos bat virus. The virus was isolated from the brain of a dead Commerson's leaf-nosed bat (Hipposideros commersoni), which is likely the natural reservoir of the virus.

References

Lyssaviruses
Bat virome